Hannover is an unincorporated community in central Oliver County, North Dakota, United States.  It lies at the intersection of North Dakota Highways 25 and 31, west of the city of Center, the county seat of Oliver County.  Its elevation is 2,142 feet (653 m).

The name derivates from the German town of Hannover in Lower Saxony. Although more than a hundred towns, islands and provinces all over the world are named after the Lower Saxonian Capital, the North Dakota settlement is the only one sticking to the correct spelling with a double ‘n’.

References

German-American culture in North Dakota
Unincorporated communities in Oliver County, North Dakota
Unincorporated communities in North Dakota